Ian Kenny is a professional rugby union referee who represents the Scottish Rugby Union. Born in Ireland, Kenny is based in Aberdeen, Scotland.

Rugby union career

Referee career

Professional career

He has refereed in the Scottish Premiership.

In 2018-19 season he was placed in the Premier Panel of SRU referees, representing the Aberdeen Society.

Kenny has been an Assistant referee in the Pro14.

He has refereed the main Craven week match in South Africa.

International career

Kenny was the Assistant Referee in the Frances - Wales U20 Six Nations match in February 2019.

He was an Assistant Referee in the Rugby Europe trophy.

He was named as an official for the 2019 Rugby World Cup.

Ian also has a career in amateur wrestling - his record is 0 - 5.

References

Living people
Scottish rugby union referees
Rugby union officials
Year of birth missing (living people)
Super 6 referees